Sar Kati Laash is a Hindi adult horror film of Bollywood directed by Teerat Singh and produced by Ajay Kumar. This film was released on 8 October 1999 in the banner of Atlanta Production. This film was dubbed in Bengali as Matha Kaata Laash.

Plot
A newly married couple come to stay in a hotel to celebrate their honeymoon but the next morning they are found dead. It is revealed that an evil spirit appears as a beheaded ghost who rapes and kill women.

Cast
 Shakti Kapoor as Shakti
 Deepak Shirke
 Sapna (actress)
 Rakesh Pandey
 Mac Mohan
 Arun Mathur
 Meghna
 Anmol
 Sakkhi
 Reshma

References

External links
 

1999 films
1990s Hindi-language films
Indian erotic horror films
1999 horror films